YT most commonly refers to YouTube, an American online video platform.

YT, Yt or yt may also refer to:

People
 Jia Yueting (English nickname "YT", born 1973), Chinese entrepreneur
 Y.T., a character in the novel Snow Crash by Neal Stephenson

Places
 YT, the ISO 3166-1 alpha-2 code for Mayotte
 .yt, the Internet top-level domain for Mayotte
 Yukon Territory, in Canada

Science and technology
 Yt antigen system, a human blood group system
 Yottatesla, an SI unit of magnetic flux density
 Yttrium, a chemical element with the former symbol Yt

Transportation
 Air Togo, IATA airline designator YT
 YT (yard tug), a United States World War II type V ship designation

See also
 Y&T, an American hard rock/heavy metal band